Akshat Verma is an Indian filmmaker who wrote and directed the feature Kaalakaandi (2018), which starred Saif Ali Khan. His previous film, Delhi Belly (2011), was produced by Aamir Khan and won multiple awards for its writing. Verma also wrote the lyrics for several songs on the film's soundtrack.

He wrote, directed and produced the critically acclaimed short film Mama's Boys in 2016, which provided a modern take on the epic Mahabharat.

Verma also wrote the film The Ode (2008), directed by Nilanjan Neil Lahiri and starring Sachin Bhatt, Wilson Cruz and Sakina Jaffrey. The film is an adaptation of the novel Ode to Lata by Ghalib Shiraz Dhalla.

Filmography

Awards and nominations

References

External links 
 

Hindi-language film directors
Film directors from Mumbai
Filmfare Awards winners
21st-century Indian film directors
Living people
Year of birth missing (living people)